Adam Hieronim Sieniawski (ca. 1576–1616) was a Polish–Lithuanian noble.

He was a deputy cup-bearer of the Crown since 1661 and starost of Jaworów.

Married to Katarzyna Kostka since 1598.

1570s births
1616 deaths
Adam